Army of Shadows is a 1969 Franco-Italian World War II suspense-drama film written and directed by Jean-Pierre Melville, and starring Lino Ventura, Paul Meurisse, Jean-Pierre Cassel, and Simone Signoret. It is an adaptation of Joseph Kessel's 1943 book of the same name, which mixes Kessel's experiences as a member of the French Resistance with fictional versions of other Resistance members.

The film follows a small group of Resistance fighters as they move between safe houses, work with the Allied militaries, kill informers, and attempt to evade the capture and execution that they know is their most likely fate. While portraying its characters as heroic, the film presents a bleak, unromantic view of the Resistance.

At the time of its initial release in France, Army of Shadows was not well-received, as, in the wake of the events of May 1968, French critics denounced it for its perceived glorification of Charles de Gaulle. American art-film programmers of the time took their cues from Cahiers du cinéma, which attacked the film on this basis, so it was not released in the United States until 2006, after a reappraisal of the film and Melville's oeuvre published in Cahiers du cinéma in the mid-1990s led to its restoration and re-release. The film was critically acclaimed in the U.S. and appeared on many critics' lists of the best films of 2006.

Plot
Philippe Gerbier, the head of a French Resistance cell, is arrested by Vichy French police on suspicion of Resistance activity. Although he is acquitted due to a lack of evidence, he is still sent to an internment camp. He and a young Communist work on an escape plan, but before they can execute it, Gerbier is transported to Paris. While waiting to be questioned by the Gestapo, he manages to kill a guard and flee.

In Marseille, Gerbier, Félix Lepercq, Guillaume "Le Bison" Vermersch, and Claude "Le Masque" Ullmann trick Paul Dounat, the young agent who betrayed Gerbier, into meeting them. They take him to a house, but discover the neighboring house is newly occupied, so they cannot use their guns to kill Dounat. Lacking a decent knife, they strangle their former associate.

Félix meets his old friend Jean-François Jardie in a bar and recruits the risk-loving former pilot to join the Resistance. While on a mission to Paris, Jean-François visits his older brother Luc, a renowned philosopher who appears to live a detached, scholarly life. He then travels to the Mediterranean coast to help evacuate some Allied soldiers, along with Gerbier and the "Big Boss", to London via a submarine to Gibraltar. Jean-François does not recognize him in the dark, but the Big Boss turns out to be Luc, whose identity is a closely guarded secret.

In London, Gerbier tries to arrange additional support for the Resistance from the Free French leadership, and Luc is decorated by Charles de Gaulle. When Gerbier learns Félix has been arrested by the Gestapo, he cuts his trip short and parachutes into the French countryside.

After Félix's arrest, Mathilde, a Parisian housewife who is part of the Resistance, moved down to Lyon to run Gerbier's cell, and Gerbier is impressed by her abilities, so he keeps her around. She devises a plan to rescue Félix, who is being tortured at the Gestapo headquarters. Jean-François, after hearing the details, writes Gerbier a letter of resignation and incriminates himself with an anonymous letter to the Gestapo so he will be jailed with Félix. Mathilde, Le Masque, and Le Bison try to rescue Félix disguised as Germans and with a forged order to transfer him to Paris, but their plan fails when the prison doctor pronounces him unfit for transport, as he is barely alive. When Jean-François, who has also been badly beaten, sees the rescue has failed, he gives Félix his only cyanide pill.

Having seen Gerbier's picture on a wanted poster during the rescue attempt, Mathilde urges him to lie low, but he says there is no one who can take his place at the moment. He is swept up in a raid by Vichy police and handed over to the Germans. Taken to be executed, Gerbier and his cellmates are told that, if they can reach the far wall of a room before they are killed by machine gunners, they will be allowed to live a little longer. Once the shooting starts, smoke bombs block the Germans' view and a rope is dropped down to Gerbier. He climbs it and escapes.

Gerbier goes to hide out for a month in an abandoned farmhouse. One day, Luc arrives to discuss what to do about Mathilde, who has been arrested. He worries she will inform on her confederates, as her teenage daughter has been threatened. Luc hides when Le Masque and Le Bison arrive with the news that Mathilde is free and two members of the Resistance have been captured. Gerbier orders Mathilde's immediate execution, but Le Bison refuses to do so and swears to prevent Gerbier from killing her, so Luc emerges and convinces Le Bison that Mathilde would want them to kill her before she is forced to identify anyone else.

Luc accompanies Gerbier, Le Bison, and Le Masque to Paris. They locate Mathilde on the street, and Le Bison shoots her twice before they drive away. Closing text reveals that all four men were captured and died within less than a year.

Cast

Nathalie Delon, who had made her big-screen debut in Melville's previous film, Le Samouraï (1967), has a cameo appearance in Army of Shadows as the woman with Jean-François at the bar in Marseille. The film's editor, Françoise Bonnot, plays the secretary at the talent agency in Lyon.

Critical reception
When it was originally released in France in 1969, the film had a poor critical reception due to the political context of the time, as the events of May 68 had hurt de Gaulle's reputation, and the glorification of the Resistance had become taboo during the Algerian War. As a result of the poor reviews, it was not initially distributed widely outside of France, but it was very well-received when it was finally released in the U.K. in the late 1970s. American audiences were unable to discover the film until 2006, when a restoration was released, and the film then appeared on many critics' top ten lists of the best films of 2006.

 1st – David Ansen, Newsweek
 1st – Ella Taylor, LA Weekly
 1st – Glenn Kenny, Premiere
 1st – Manohla Dargis, The New York Times
 1st – Scott Foundas, LA Weekly
 1st – Stephanie Zacharek, Salon
 2nd – Jonathan Rosenbaum, Chicago Reader (tied with Statues Also Die)
 2nd – Michael Sragow, The Baltimore Sun
 2nd – Nathan Lee, The Village Voice
 2nd – Wesley Morris, The Boston Globe

 3rd – Stephen Hunter, The Washington Post
 4th – Shawn Levy, The Oregonian
 4th – Sheri Linden, The Hollywood Reporter
 5th – Marjorie Baumgarten, The Austin Chronicle
 7th – Richard James Havis, The Hollywood Reporter
 7th – Richard Schickel, Time magazine
 8th – Michael Wilmington, Chicago Tribune
Unranked top ten
 Steven Rea, The Philadelphia Inquirer
 V.A. Musetto, New York Post

On review aggregator website Rotten Tomatoes, the film has a 97% approval rating based on 76 reviews, with an average score of 8.6 out of 10; the site's "critics consensus" reads: "Originally made in 1969, this recently reissued classic is a masterful examination of the inner workings of the World War II resistance efforts." On Metacritic, the film has a weighted average score of 99 out of 100 based on 24 reviews, indicating "universal acclaim".

Upon its 2006 release, Roger Ebert added Army of Shadows to his "Great Movies" list, writing: "This restored 35mm print, now in art theaters around the country, may be 37 years old, but it is the best foreign film of the year."

Cinematographer Roger Deakins has called Army of Shadows one of his favorite films, as has director Lawrence Kasdan.

Home media
In Europe, the British Film Institute released the film on Region 2 DVD in November 2006. It was released on Blu-ray as part of the StudioCanal Collection in 2013, with a bonus documentary and a booklet as special features.

In the United States, the film was released by the Criterion Collection on both Region 1 DVD and Blu-ray in May 2007. This release was out of print by 2010 and re-issued in April 2020.

References

External links
 
 
 
 
 
 Army of Shadows: Out of the Shadows an essay by Amy Taubin at the Criterion Collection

1969 films
1969 war films
Films set in London
Films set in Lyon
Films set in Paris
Films shot in France
1960s French-language films
French war drama films
Italian war drama films
1960s war drama films
Holocaust films
Films about the French Resistance
Films directed by Jean-Pierre Melville
World War II films based on actual events
French World War II films
Italian World War II films
Films based on French novels
1960s Italian films
1960s French films